Taça de Macau em futebol, also known as the Macau FA Cup is the top football knockout tournament in Macau.

List of finals

References

Football competitions in Macau
Macau